Israel competed at the 2019 Winter Deaflympics held between 12 and 21 December 2019 in Province of Sondrio in Northern Italy. The country won one gold medal and the country finished in 7th place in the medal table.

Medalists

Chess 

Yehuda Gruenfeld won the gold medal in the men's blitz tournament.

References 

Winter Deaflympics
Nations at the 2019 Winter Deaflympics